Howard Francis Taylor (born 1939) is an American sociologist and Professor of Sociology Emeritus at Princeton University, where he was formerly the director of the African-American Studies program. He is known for his 1980 book The IQ Game, in which he reanalyzed data from several previous reared-apart twin studies of the heritability of IQ. The book concluded, controversially, that the influence of genes on individual differences in IQ scores was small.

Education and career
Taylor graduated Phi Beta Kappa from Hiram College in 1961 and received his Ph.D. from Yale University in 1966. In addition to Princeton University, he has also taught at the Illinois Institute of Technology and Syracuse University. He first joined the faculty at Princeton in 1973.

Awards and positions
Taylor served as president of the Eastern Sociological Society from 1996 to 1997. In 1998, he received the Cox-Johnson-Frazier Award from the American Sociological Association. In 2000, he received the President's Award for Distinguished Teaching from Princeton.

Books
Balance in Small Groups (Van Nostrand Reinhold, 1970)
The IQ Game: A Methodological Inquiry into the Heredity-Environment Controversy (Rutgers University Press/Harvester Press, 1980)

References

External links
Faculty page
Howard F. Taylor Black Leadership Network study papers from Princeton University Library. Special Collections

1939 births
Living people
American sociologists
Princeton University faculty
Hiram College alumni
Yale University alumni
Illinois Institute of Technology faculty
Syracuse University faculty
Black studies scholars